Junghuhnia africana is a species of crust fungus in the family Steccherinaceae. The type specimen was collected in Bwindi Impenetrable National Park, Uganda, growing on a rotting hardwood log. Its ellipsoid spores measure 5–6 by 4–4.5 µm. The fungus was described as new to science in 2005 by mycologists Perpetua Ipulet & Leif Ryvarden.

References

Fungi described in 2005
Fungi of Africa
Steccherinaceae
Taxa named by Leif Ryvarden